Mazaruca Airport  is a public use airstrip serving Mazaruca, a hamlet on the eastern bank of the Paraná Ibicuy River (es) in the Entre Ríos Province of Argentina. The runway follows an unpaved road running northeast from a northern corner of the hamlet.

Our Airports reports the airport is closed, runway unusable.

See also

Transport in Argentina
List of airports in Argentina

References

External links 
OpenStreetMap - Mazaruca Airport

Airports in Argentina
Entre Ríos Province